The National Highways & Motorway Police, abbreviated NHMP, is a police force in Pakistan that is responsible for enforcement of traffic and safety laws, security and recovery on Pakistan's National Highways and Motorway network. NHMP use SUVs, cars and heavy motorbikes for patrolling purposes and uses speed cameras for enforcing speed limits.

History 
The Pakistan Motorways Police began in 1997 for policing Pakistan's newly constructed motorway network, starting with the M-2. Later, in June 2001, it was also assigned the additional task of patrolling Pakistan's National Highways starting with Pakistan's longest national highway, the N-5. With the assignment of the additional role of patrolling the National Highways, the name of the Pakistan Motorways Police was changed to "National Highways & Motorway Police." In February 2007, NHMP started policing the Makran Coastal Highway (N-10).

The Inspector General of Police (Enforcement) Mr. Afzal Ali Shigri was tasked to prepare the plan for the new force. He was ably assisted by Mr. Shamim Ahmed, a junior officer from the National Transport Research Cell. He conceived, developed and prepared a comprehensive proposal to establish an efficient and modern highway police for the new motorway. With the change of the government the plan was shelved. This plan with slight modifications was established later by Mr. Iftikhar Rashid (Inspector General of Police), who not only implemented the plan but also ensured it achieved the bench marks laid down at its inception.

Organization 
The NHMP is headquartered in Islamabad and led by the Inspector-General of Police (IGP) along with by seven Deputy Inspector-Generals (DIGs), each in charge of a separate branch. The rank structure is as follows:
 Inspector General of Police (IGP) 
 Additional Inspector General of Police (Addl. IGP)
 Deputy Inspector General of Police (DIG)
 Assistant Inspector General of Police (AIG)
 Senior Superintendent of Police (SSP)
 Superintendent of Police (SP)
 Deputy Superintendent of Police (DSP)
 Assistant Superintendent of Police (ASP)
 Inspector of Police (IP)
 Sub Inspector of Police (SIP)
 Assistant Sub Inspector of Police (ASIP)
 Head Constable of Police (HP)
 Constable of Police (CP)

Area of Jurisdiction 
For policing purposes, the national highways and motorway network is divided into the Nine Zones, each headed by a DIG and supervised by three Addl. IGPs. Each Zone is divided into multiple "sectors" and led by an SSPs and SPs. Each sector is further divided into "beats", each led by a DSP.

 Currently Under Operations - 3,999 km roads
 Future Operations plan - 4659 km roads

Current Operations 

|Training College Zone
|Sheikhupura
|Headquarter Zone
|Islamabad

Proposed Deployment

Inspector Generals - NHMP

Recruitment and training 
Before start of policing on M–2 (Islamabad – Lahore Motorway) in 1997 all the officers were selected from within the existing police set ups of the country and an extensive training program was prepared for them in order to bring them up to international standards of Motorway/Expressway policing. Both local and foreign instructors imparted the training. Local training was given at Police College Sihala. To meet the international standards, experts from UK and Nordic Countries were invited who, along with local experts, trained our officers in advance driving skills and management of various types of incidents. A foreign training course with South Wales Police, U.K. and German Police in Kiel was also conducted to ameliorate personnel of this flourishing force up to the global standard of policing. In addition, services of armed forces were also utilized for advance driving skills particularly for motorcycles.

In order to impart customized training related to Highways/Motorway NHMP has set up its own Training College at Sheikhupura with the following mandate:

i) To train the newly selected Officers on basic police course.

ii) To organize NHMP orientation training of already trained Officers.

iii) To organize Driving Training for fresh recruited Officers.

iv) To organize advance courses for Drivers to make them Driving Instructors.

v) To organize Wireless training courses for Wireless Operators.

vi) To organize short courses on SOPs & functioning of NHMP.

vii) To organize technical courses on use of Misc. Equipment (Provida, Wireless Sets etc.).

viii) To organize courses on Physical Fitness.

ix) To organize Fire Shooting Course.

x) To organize First Aid Training Course.

xi) To conduct promotional exams for different cadres.

xii) To conduct refresher courses for senior officers.

xiii) To act as a platform for provision of training by foreign experts.

Training Institute is working at its full swing and since January 2006, has trained over 129 trainers in different categories. Training Institute has the honor to train over 400 officers of Islamabad Model Traffic Police and recently trained 40 Senior Officers of Punjab Traffic Police as Trainers to train over 6000 newly recruited Traffic Wardens of Punjab Police. Besides this training Institute has successfully completed Lower Intermediate and Upper Class Promotion Courses in addition to a number of Capacity Building short courses like orientation for Deputationists, Refresher Courses for the CPOs/Admin Officers, Moharrars, Weapon handling, Record Keeping etc. Another landmark for the Training Institute is to complete on its own 1st Commando Course for about 27 Officers with 10 Officers doing Para Gliding Courses including 4 lady Officers.

It is worth mentioning that all the above development have been made with the limited available resources under the previous guidance and encouragement of the Worthy Inspector General, NHMP who has been taking personal interest to make the Training Institute a hub of learning and road model for all other Police Training Institute in the country. 
 
Training strategy

After study of the current policing system and the culture... a comprehensive training strategy is devised to build a force which is honest, professional, dedicated and service – oriented. Main elements of the training strategy in NHMP are:

• TNA to assess training needs
• SWOT Analysis Training Techniques
• Quality Instructors
• Modern Techniques of Instruction
1.Syndicate/Participative System
2.Simulation Exercises 
3.Case Studies
4.Driving Skills
• Respectful Training Environment
• Foreign Training

Selection criteria and requirements

SPO (Senior Patrolling Officer)
16
Graduation at least 2nd Division (Preferably Law) and
LTV Driving Licence
20 Years to 27 Years 	
5' 8" for Male 5'4" for Female
3.5 to 35 with Expansion for Male only.

PO (Patrolling Officer)
14	
Graduation at least 2nd Division and LTV Driving Licence
18 Years to 25 Years 	
5' 8" for Male 5'4" for Female
33.5 to 35 with Expansion for Male only.

APO (Assistant Patrolling Officer)
07	
Intermediate, LTV Driving Licence, 03 Years driving experience
18 Years to 25 Years	
5' 8" for Male 5'4" for Female
33.5 to 35 with Expansion for Male only.

JPO (Junior Patrolling Officer)
05
Matric, LTV Driving Licence, 03 Years driving experience
18 Years - 25 Years 	
5' 8" for Male 5'4" for Female
33.5 to 35 with Expansion for Male only.

Selection method

In all the above categories of selection the candidate has to go through a thorough selection process.
Candidate has to:

• Submit complete application in all respects.

• Qualify the physical test including running, height and chest measurements etc.

• Pass the written test.

• Pass the Interview.

The selected candidates are examined for medical fitness. Physically and mentally fit candidates are then ready for National Highways & Motorway Police Training.

Equipment 

The NHMP patrolling and rescue vehicles include the Toyota Land Cruiser, Prado SUV, Toyota Corolla, Toyota Hilux, Toyota Hiace, Mazda Trucks and Suzuki 500 and 750 CC motorcycles. 

Scientific and latest equipment are procured by spending huge government exchequer and utilized to curb the tendency of violation on National Highways & Motorway. The list of some useful equipment is as under:- 	
  	
i) Provida 2000/Vascar: This radar is fitted with video and it not only detects speed but also has a printer, which gives the picture of the vehicle along with detail of prescribed speed and actual speed of the vehicle. This has helped NHMP in preventing corruption and argument amongst commuter and police officer.

ii) Hand Held Radar/Laser Gun: This is a gun like radar and is used to detect speed but cannot record it.

iii) Emergency/Accident: This includes emergency Equipment/Boards like " Accident Ahead ", Traffic Diversion Cones and Cone Lights etc., which are used to secure the areas of accident/incident both during day and night.

iv) Search Light: For surveillance at night, every vehicle is provided with a search light with a power of 400,000 C.P., which helps in detecting any criminal activity and in case of accident/incident etc. at night.

v) Video/Still Camera: Each sector is provided with one each of Video Camera and Still Camera in order to make video film and photographs of the area of the accident/incident.

vi) First Aid Boxes: NHMP is the first to reach at the site of accident/incident. They have been given special training to provide first aid to the injured on the spot.

vii) Communications System: NHMP is using latest equipment for Wireless Communication through repeater based/direct UHF, VHF’s.

viii) Weber Hydraulic Cutters: NHMP have also recently procured 47 Weber Hydraulic Cutters as Rescue equipment. This equipment helps in effective Accident Management and Recovery of injured persons.

ix) Night Vision Speed Checking Devices: NHMP are now also using night vision speed checking devices to improve the quality of work of this elite force.

E Ticketing  
E Ticketing project of National Highways and Motorway Police was conceived and implemented by Syed Abbas Ahsan, DIG Police. The pilot project was initiated in collaboration with PITB in July 2015 and the first trials were conducted in August 2015. After successful trials, the system was expanded and implemented on all Motorways and National Highways on 25 January 2018. For his successful design and implementation of the system, Mr. Abbas Ahsan received an appreciation letter from the Inspector General of Police Dr. Syed Kaleem Imam and was nominated for a Civil Award.

E Ticketing is a technology-oriented solution in which the Patrol Officers are equipped with a hand held device connected with central data server. It enables the officers to issue tickets to commuters on the spot, verify vehicle registration, license information and maintain a retrievable and geo-tagged record of rules violations. Moreover, the system also documents road accidents, help provided to commuters and their feedback. In addition, the system tracks and keeps a complete record of the performance of each officer along with timestamps and geo-tags. The project is also cost efficient as the costs including capital and recurring costs are less than the cost of printing of challan books in the paper based ticketing system. SPO Waseem Nawaz has played a significant role in the implementation of E-Ticketing across the country. He completed GIS from Peshawar to Rahim Yar khan then Karachi to Gawadar and Quetta on highways and Motorways, He also imparted Training to the field staff in the field and off the field. He also chaired E-Ticketing Conference for 6 times in Pakistan.

See also
Motorways of Pakistan
National Highways of Pakistan
Highway patrol

External links 
 Pakistan National Highways & Motorway Police
 National Highway Authority

References

Pakistan federal departments and agencies
Federal law enforcement agencies of Pakistan
1997 establishments in Pakistan
Government agencies established in 1997
Ministry of Communications (Pakistan)